Here is a listing of the most referenced bioacoustics software.

See also 
 Free software
 Open-Source Software
 General Public License (GPL)

External links 
 Steven L. Hopp bioacoustics listing of sound analysis software—this is out of date, but might still be of some value.

Bioacoustics Software